Sharon Fichman and Marie-Ève Pelletier were the defending champions, having won the event in 2012, but Pelletier had retired this year after the 2013 Australian Open. Fichman partnered up with Gabriela Dabrowski as the first seeds and they went on to win the title, defeating Misa Eguchi and Eri Hozumi in the final, 7–6(8–6), 6–3.

Seeds

Draw

References 
 Draw

Cooper Challenger
Waterloo Challenger